The 2018 Rally Estonia (formally known as the Shell Helix Rally Estonia 2018) was a motor racing event for rally cars that was held over three days between 13 and 15 July 2018. It marked the eighth running of Rally Estonia. The event consisted of sixteen special stages totalling  in competitive kilometres. The stages were run on smooth gravel roads of Southern Estonia. Two street stages were also held during the rally, in Tartu and in Elva. Rally headquarters and service park were based in Otepää, at the Tehvandi Sports Center, while city of Tartu hosted the ceremonial start and finish.

Ott Tänak & Martin Järveoja won the rally, while Hayden Paddon & Sebastian Marshall finished second and Craig Breen & Scott Martin finished third. For the first time in the competition's history a total of three current WRC works teams entered Rally Estonia. It was also the first time the new Toyota Yaris WRC entered a competition outside the WRC series. Tänak & Järveoja were dominant on their home ground winning eleven stages out of sixteen.

Report

Classification

Special stages

References

External links
 The official website of Rally Estonia

Rally Estonia
2018 in Estonian sport
July 2018 sports events in Europe